Henry George Farmer (17 January 1882 – 20 December 1965) was a British musicologist and Arabist. He studied under Thomas Hunter Weir, Professor of Oriental Languages at University of Glasgow.  He wrote extensively about Arab musical influences on the European musical tradition and the Islamic legacy to music theory.

Life and career
Farmer was born in Birr Barracks, near Birr, Offaly (Kings County), Ireland, where his father, also Henry George Farmer (1848-1900), was stationed with the Prince of Wales's Leinster Regiment of the British Army.  His mother, Mary Ann Harling (1850-1907), was related to Afflecks and Allans of Scotland. Henry grew up in a disciplinarian family and part of an Anglo-Irish community in the Irish Midlands.  By age seven he began studying piano, choral singing and harmony.  The organist and choirmaster Vincent Sykes (b.1851) tutored him.  The Farmers were originally from Berkshire and had several musical connections. In 1888 Henry George visited relatives in Nottingham who owned a music warehouse. An earlier Henry Farmer (1819-1891) had composed popular liturgy - Mass in B-flat and concertos.  His nephew was John Farmer (1835-1901), also a music teacher, organist and composer.

Farmer represented Britain at the 1932 Cairo Congress of Arab Music and wrote on a wide range of topics from Turkish, Scottish and Irish musical traditions, including British military music. He contributed generously to Grove's Dictionary of Music  (fifth edition).  He died in Law, South Lanarkshire, Scotland, aged 83.

A collection of Farmer's papers is housed at the Special Collections Department of the Glasgow University Library at the University of Glasgow.

Books

The Rise & Development of Military Music. London: W. Reeves (1912).
The Arabic Musical Manuscripts in the Bodleian Library: A Descriptive Catalogue With Illustrations of Musical Instruments. London: W. Reeves. (1925)
The Arabian Influence on Musical Theory. London: H. Reeves.(1925). 
Byzantine Musical Instruments in the Ninth Century. London: Harold Reeves (1925).
A History of Arabian Music to the XIIIth Century. London: Luzac & Co (1929). 
Historical Facts for the Arabian Musical Influence. Ayer Publishing (1930) .
The Organ of the Ancients, From Eastern Sources (Hebrew, Syriac and Arabic). London: W. Reeves (1931). 
Studies in Oriental Musical Instruments. Glasgow: The Civic Press (1939). 
The Sources of Arabian Music: An Annotated Bibliography of Arabic Manuscripts Which Deal With the Theory, Practice, and History of Arabian Music. Bearsden, Scotland (issued privately by author) (1940). 
Sa'adyah Gaon on the Influence of Music. London: A. Probsthain (1943). 
Concerts in 18th Century Scotland. J.C. Erskine (1945). 
The Glen Collection of Musical Instruments. Glasgow (1945). 
The Minstrelsy of The Arabian Nights: A Study of Music and Musicians in the Arabic Alf laila wa laila. Bearsden, Scotland (issued privately) (1945). 
A History of Music in Scotland. Hinrichsen Ed. (1947). .
Music Making in the Olden Days: The Story of the Aberdeen Concerts, 1748-1801. New York: Peters-Hinrichsen Ed. (1950). 
Cavaliere Zavertal and the Royal Artillery Band. London: Hinrichsen Ed., lcd., Museum House (1951). 
Oriental Studies, Mainly Musical. London, New York: Hinrichsen Ed. (1953). 
History of the Royal Artillery Band, 1762-1953. London: Royal Artillery Institution (1954) 
The Song Captions in the Kitab al-aghani al-kabir. London: H. Baron (1955). 
Bernard Shaw's Sister and Her Friends: A New Angle on G.B.S. Leiden: E. J. Brill (1959).
Handel's Kettledrums, and Other Papers on Military Music. London: Hinrichsen (1965). 
The Science of Music in the Mafatih Al-Ulum. Reprinted from the Transactions of the Glasgow University Oriental Society, v. 17. (1959). 
Al-Farabi's Arabic-Latin Writings on Music in the Ihsa al-'ulum. New York: Hinrichsen Ed. (1965). 
British Bands in Battle. New York, London: Hinrichsen (1965).

Articles & Misc. Publications

The Influence of Music: From Arabic Sources Proceedings of the Musical Association, 52nd Session, pp. 89–124 (1925). 
Clues for the Arabian Influence on European Musical Theory Journal of the Royal Asiatic Society JRAS; Vol.57, 1, Jan 1925, pp. 61–80
Turkoman Music (letter to editor). The Musical Times, v.69, no.1027 (Sept 1928), p. 833 (1928). 
Music in Mediæval Scotland. Proceedings of the Musical Association, 56th Session, pp. 69–90 (1929). Greek Theorists of Music in Arabic Translation. Isis, v.13, no.2 (Feb 1930), pp. 325–333 (1930).Orchestral Drum-Names (letter to editor). The Musical Times, v.71, no.1050 (Aug 1930), p. 740 (1930). A Sample of Musical Biography (letter to editor). The Musical Times, v.72, no.1063 (Sept 1931), p. 833 (1931). British Musicians a Century Ago. Music & Letters, v.12, no.4 (Oct 1931), pp. 384–392 (1931). A Forgotten Composer of Anthems: William Savage (1720–89).  Music & Letters, v.17, no.3 (July 1936), pp. 188–199 (1936). Unknown Birthdays of Some Georgian Musicians. Music & Letters, v.20, no.3 (Jul 1939), pp. 299–303.Some Notes on the Irish Harp. Music & Letters, v.24, no.2 (Apr 1943), pp. 100–107.Music of the Arabian Nights. Journal of the Royal Asiatic Society Vol.76, 3-4, Oct 1944, pp. 172–185An Historic March.  Music & Letters, v. 26, no. 3 (Jul 1945), pp. 172–177 (1945). Ghosts': An Excursus on Arabic Musical Bibliographies. Isis, v.36, no.2, pp. 123–130 (Jan 1946).Crusading Martial Music.  Music & Letters, v.30, no.3, pp. 243–249. (Jul 1949)Music Down Below.  The Musical Times, v.90, no.1279, pp. 307–309. (Sept 1949)Henry George Farmer. Birr man recalls sixty years of a town's musical traditions. Midland Tribune, (17 June 1961).Monster Kettledrums.  Music & Letters, v.43, no.2 (Apr 1962), pp. 129–130 (1962). ʿAbdalqādir ibn Ġaibī on Instruments of Music.  Oriens, v.15, pp. 242–248. (Dec 1962).

Bibliography
 S. Burstyn: 'The "Arabian Influence" Thesis Revisited', CMc, nos.45–7 (1990), 119–46
 A.J. Racy: 'Historical World Views of Early Ethnomusicologists: an East-West Encounter in Cairo, 1932', Ethnomusicology and Modern Music History, ed. S. Blum, P.V. Bohlman and D.M. Neuman (Urbana, IL, 1991), 68–91
 C. Cowl and S.M. Craik: Henry George Farmer: a Bibliography (Glasgow, 1999)
A. Shiloah: 'Assessment of Farmer's Importance and Influence in the Field of Arab Music', in C. Cowl and S.M. Craik, comps., Henry George Farmer: A Bibliography (Glasgow, 1999), xxii-vi. 
I.J. Katz, with the collaboration of S.M. Craik: Henry George Farmer and the First International Congress of Arab Music (Cairo, 1932) (Leiden, 2015).
_: Robert Lachmann's Correspondece with Henry George Farmer (from 1923 to 1938)'' (Leiden, 2020).

References

External links
Henry George Farmer collection
Henry George Farmer papers

1882 births
1965 deaths
Arabic music
People from County Offaly
Irish orientalists
British orientalists
British Arabists
20th-century British musicologists